Richard John Denning (born 11 August 1967) is an English author of historical novels and fantasy novels. Currently he has published seven novels. The genre of his books are historical fiction, horror, and fantasy. Denning also is a board game designer.

Biography
Denning was born in Ilkeston in 1967. He attended Myton School in Warwick and the University of Manchester, where he studied medicine. After graduating he worked in a hospital in the West Midlands before completing training as a General Practitioner (GP). Since 1994, Denning has been working in a surgery in North Birmingham. He is married with two children.

He is a writer of historical fiction novels as well as horror and fantasy. Other than writing, his main interests are games of all types. He is the designer of a board game based on the Great Fire of London. He is an organiser of UK Games Expo, an exhibition of board games, card games and role-playing games held annually in Birmingham in the UK.

Novel series

Northern Crown Series
Cerdic and his friends witness and become key participants in the great events of the late 6th and early 7th century which will lead to the golden age of the Kingdom of Northumbria: the Kingdom of Bede, where the roots of much of the traditions that form England originate. One day, the Vikings would sweep it all away, but by then the mark left on the history of England by the golden age of Northumbria, could not be erased.

The first book of the Northern Crown series is  The Amber Treasure. The main character, Cerdic, is the nephew of a great warrior who died a hero of the Anglo-Saxon country of Deira. Growing up in a quiet village, he dreams of the glories of battle and of one day writing his name into the sagas. He experiences the true horrors of war, however, when his home is attacked, his sister kidnapped, his family betrayed and his uncle's legendary sword stolen. Cerdic is thrown into the struggles that will determine the future of 6th century Britain and must show courageous leadership and overcome treachery, to save his kingdom, rescue his sister and return home with his uncle's sword.

The Amber Treasure has been awarded a B.R.A.G. Medallion.

The story continues in Child of Loki, in which the focus shifts North to the fledgling Scottish kingdom of Dal Riata and involved the Battle of Degsastan in the year 603.

In the third novel, Princes in Exile, Cerdic accompanies Princes Edwin and Hereric of Northumbria into Exile.

The Hourglass Series

Young Adult Time Travel adventure series.

The first book of the Hourglass series is Tomorrow's Guardian. The main character Tom Oakley experiences disturbing episodes of déjà-vu and believes he is going mad. Then he discovers that he's a “Walker” – someone who can transport himself to other times and places. Tom dreams about other “Walkers” in moments of mortal danger: Edward Dyson killed in a battle in 1879; Mary Brown who perished in the Great Fire of London; and Charlie Hawker, a sailor who drowned on a U-boat in 1943. Agreeing to travel back in time and rescue them, Tom has three dangerous adventures, before returning to the present day. But Tom's troubles have only just begun. He finds that he's drawn the attention of evil individuals who seek to bend history to their will. Soon, Tom's family are obliterated from existence and Tom must make a choice between saving them and saving his entire world.

The second book of the Hourglass series is Yesterday's Treasures. Everyone is searching for pieces of The Crown of Knossos: historical artefacts which when assembled allow control over all of history in this and in the Twisted reality. The Hourglass Institute, Redfeld's masters and even the Directorate are soon in the hunt. One by one the pieces are found but eventually Tom and the others discover who is really after The Crown and what their motivations are. It is only then that they realise the extent of the danger, for 'Yesterday's Treasures' can mean the destruction of tomorrow.

The Praesidium Series 
The first book of this series is The Last Seal. 17th century London - two rival secret societies are caught in a battle that threatens to destroy the city and beyond. When a truant schoolboy, Ben, finds a scroll revealing the location of magical seals that binds a powerful demon beneath the city, he is thrown into the centre of a dangerous plot that leads to the Great Fire of 1666.

Nine Worlds Series 
Shield Maiden is the first book in The Nine Worlds series in which the historical world of Anglo-Saxon England meets the mysterious world of myths and legends, gods and monsters they believed in.

Board Games
Richard Denning is the founder of Medusa Games. Medusa Games is based in Birmingham UK and is developing board and card games.

Great Fire: London 1666

The players are men of wealth and standing who own property around London. They can use the trained bands to fight the fire, use demolitions to destroy blocks of housing to prevent the fire flowing or turn a blind eye and allow the fire to spread and damage rival's property. Victory can belong to the player with the most property left but putting out fires can give you a boost. In addition each player will have several hidden objectives which might include helping another player or protecting parts of the city. Players 3-6, duration 75 to 90 minutes.

Bibliography
2009 – The Amber Treasure
2010 – Tomorrow's Guardian
2010 - The Last Seal
2011 - Yesterday's Treasures
2012 - Child of Loki
2012 - Shield Maiden
2013 - Princes in Exile

References

External links
 Author's official site
 Medusa Games site for Great Fire board game
 The UK Games Expo website
 A reading from The Amber Treasure
 A reading from Tomorrow's Guardian

English historical novelists
1967 births
Living people
Alumni of the University of Manchester
Medical doctors from the West Midlands (county)
Writers of historical fiction set in the Middle Ages
Writers of historical fiction set in the modern age
People from Ilkeston
British general practitioners